Sanaa imperialis is a species of bush cricket (or katydid) found in the tropical forests of South and Southeast Asia. It was described originally by Adam White from a specimen obtained from Sylhet in Bangladesh. The description was published in 1846 and it was given the name Locusta imperialis. It was moved into the genus Sanaa by Francis Walker in 1870.

References

Pseudophyllinae
imperialis
Insects described in 1846